David John Howard
The Hon. Clyde Mascoll''' (born 15 December 1959) is a politician from Barbados. He is a former leader of the Democratic Labour Party (DLP). In 2003, Mascoll unsuccessfully led the party in an election against the ruling Barbados Labour Party (BLP). However, after internal disagreement within the DLP, Mascoll "crossed the floor" to become a member of the ruling BLP in 2006, becoming Minister of State in the Ministry of Finance.

He was defeated in his St. Michael North West constituency by the DLP's Christopher Sinckler in the January 2008 general election, receiving 44% of the vote.

References

Living people
Leaders of the Democratic Labour Party (Barbados)
Government ministers of Barbados
Members of the House of Assembly of Barbados
1959 births